The Federal Council of Churches, officially the Federal Council of Churches of Christ in America, was an ecumenical association of Christian denominations in the United States in the early twentieth century. It represented the Anglican, Baptist, Eastern Orthodox, Lutheran, Methodist, Moravian, Oriental Orthodox, Polish National Catholic, Presbyterian, and Reformed traditions of Christianity. It merged with other ecumenical bodies in 1950 to form the present day National Council of Churches.

History
The Federal Council of Churches was founded at a convention that met at the Academy of Music in Philadelphia in May 1908. Originally the Council consisted of thirty-two denominations. By 1923, it maintained central offices at 105 East 22nd Street, New York City. It also had offices at the Woodward Building, Washington, D.C., and at 19 South La Salle Street, Chicago.

Social and political advocacy
The Federal Council of Churches was active in the Temperance and Prohibition of alcohol movements.

Additionally, the council was an organization that believed very deeply in democracy.  In its statement on the nature and tasks of Christian Cooperation, the Council declared:

With the demand for industrial democracy the churches are intensely concerned, for democracy is the expression of Christianity.

The Social Creeds
"The Social Creed of the Churches" was a statement by members of the Federal Council of Churches in December 1908 against what it described as "industrial problems." The document spelled out a list of principles, including:

Equal rights and complete justice for all men in all stations of life
Protection of the worker from dangerous machinery, occupational disease, injuries, and mortality
Abolition of child labor
Regulation of the conditions of toil for women as shall safeguard the physical and moral health of the community
A living wage as a minimum in every industry
Provision for the old age of the workers and for those incapacitated by injury
Abatement of poverty

Over time the Council included additional principles, including addressing the injustice of the unequal distribution of wealth.

Critics attacked the Federal Council of Churches as a front for communism.

Member denominations
By 1923 the member denominations were as follows:

African Methodist Episcopal Church
African Methodist Episcopal Zion Church
Colored Methodist Episcopal Church in America
General Convention of the Christian Church
Christian Reformed Church in North America
Churches of God in North America (General Eldership)
Disciples of Christ
Episcopal Church
Evangelical Synod of North America
Evangelical Association
Free Baptist Church
Greek Orthodox Church
Friends
Methodist Episcopal Church
Methodist Episcopal Church, South
Methodist Protestant Church
Moravian Church
National Council of Congregational Churches
National Baptist Convention
Northern Baptist Convention
Polish National Catholic Church
Presbyterian Church in the United States of America
Presbyterian Church in the United States
Primitive Methodist Church
Reformed Church in America
Reformed Church in the United States
Reformed Episcopal Church
Reformed Presbyterian Church, General Synod
Romanian Orthodox Church
Russian Orthodox Church
Seventh Day Baptist Church
Syrian Orthodox Church
United Brethren Church
Ukrainian Orthodox Church
United Evangelical Church
United Presbyterian Church
United Lutheran Church (consultative)

Commissions 

The FCC worked through a number of Commissions which addressed various social issues of the day. These included the Commission on the Church and Social Service which carried out research and education on industrial problems, the Commission on International Justice and Goodwill which stressed "Christian internationalism" and campaigned for the reduction of armaments and the Commission on Councils of Churches which worked on organizing local federations of churches in larger communities so they could be a more effect force in their neighborhoods. Other commissions included the Commission on Negro Churches and Race Relations, Commission on Evangelism, Commission on Education, Commission on Temperance, Commission on Relations with Religious Bodies in Europe and the Commission on Community Relations, which was founded in May 1923, "gives attention neighborhood programme of local churches, the housing of the community work of open churches, the social service work of local federations of Churches and represents the Protestant group in conferences of national social agencies working in communities."

References 

National councils of churches
1908 establishments in Pennsylvania
Christian organizations established in 1908
Religious organizations disestablished in 1950